{{DISPLAYTITLE:C15H11ClO2}}
The molecular formula C15H11ClO2 (molar mass: 258.70 g/mol) may refer to:

 Cloridarol
 Fluorenylmethyloxycarbonyl chloride (Fmoc-Cl)

Molecular formulas